"Da Ya Think I'm Sexy?", also written "Da' Ya' Think I'm Sexy", is a song by British singer Rod Stewart from his ninth studio album, Blondes Have More Fun (1978). It was written by Stewart, Carmine Appice and Duane Hitchings, though it incorporates the melody from the song "Taj Mahal" by Jorge Ben Jor and the string arrangement from the song "(If You Want My Love) Put Something Down On It" by Bobby Womack.

The song was released as the first single from Blondes Have More Fun in November 1978. It spent one week atop the UK Singles Chart in December 1978 and four weeks atop the US Billboard Hot 100 in February 1979. Billboard ranked it number four on its Top Singles of 1979 year-end chart. It also topped the charts in Canada for four weeks and in Australia for two weeks.

Royalties from the song were donated to the United Nations Children's Fund (UNICEF) and Stewart performed the song at the Music for UNICEF Concert at the United Nations General Assembly in January 1979. Rolling Stone ranked the song at number 308 in its 2004 list of the 500 Greatest Songs of All Time.

Background and writing
Carmine Appice, who played drums on this song told Songfacts: "This was a story of a guy meeting a chick in a club. At that time, that was a cool saying. If you listen to the lyrics, 'She sits alone, waiting for suggestions, he's so nervous...' it's the feelings of what was going on in a dance club. The guy sees a chick he digs, she's nervous and he's nervous and she's alone and doesn't know what's going on, then they end up at his place having sex, and then she's gone." In a 2007 interview, co-writer Duane Hitchings noted that "Da Ya Think I'm Sexy?" was 

It has been noted that Stewart created parts of the song through musical plagiarism. A copyright infringement lawsuit by Brazilian musician Jorge Ben Jor claimed the chorus of the song had been derived from his song "Taj Mahal". The case was "settled amicably" according to Jorge Ben Jor, in Ben Jor's favor. Stewart admitted in his 2012 autobiography to "unconscious plagiarism" of the Ben Jor song, which he had heard while attending the Rio Carnival in 1978. He also admitted that he had consciously lifted the song's signature synthesizer riff from the string arrangement on Bobby Womack's "(If You Want My Love) Put Something Down On It". Stewart contends that it is legal to lift a line from any song's arrangement as long as the core melody line is not copied.

Reception
The song was criticised by many in the rock press as a betrayal of Stewart's blues-oriented rock roots, due to its disco-like arrangement, but Stewart and others were quick to point out that other widely respected artists, such as Paul McCartney and the Rolling Stones, had also released disco-flavoured songs. However, the song has since experienced some retrospective acclaim as Rolling Stone placed the song at number 308 in its 2004 list of the 500 Greatest Songs of All Time.

Cash Box said it has "a clipping bass line [by Phil Chen], steady kick drum and soaring synthesized strings" as well as "alternately gentle and dashing rhythm guitar work and a commanding sax solo."

Charts

Weekly charts

Year-end charts

All-time charts

Certifications

Revolting Cocks version

Industrial supergroup Revolting Cocks (featuring Richard 23 of Front 242, Luc van Acker, and Al Jourgensen of Ministry) recorded a version of Da Ya Think I'm Sexy for their album Linger Ficken' Good. The song was released as a single in September 1993 with the songs "Sergio Guitar" and "Wrong Sexy Mix" as B-sides. This version includes slightly altered lyrics (the lyric "Give me a dime so I can call my mother" is replaced with "Give me a buck so I can buy a rubber" and "He says, I'm sorry, but I'm out of milk and coffee." is replaced with "He says, I'm sorry, but I'm out of KY Jelly.")http://www.songlyrics.com/revolting-cocks/do-ya-think-i-m-sexy-lyrics/

N-Trance featuring Rod Stewart version

In 1997, the song was remixed by English electronic dance music group N-Trance for their second album, Happy Hour (1998), and features lyrics from the Millie Jackson version (as performed by vocalist Kelly Llorenna). It was featured in the film A Night at the Roxbury the following year. This version became a hit in late 1997, topping both the New Zealand Singles Chart for three weeks and the Czech Republic singles chart. Additionally, the song peaked at number seven on the UK Singles Chart and earning a double-platinum sales certification in Australia, where it charted at number three.

Critical reception
Larry Flick from Billboard described the song as "another slice of flashback fever". He noted that "with its recognizable hook, booty-shakin' baseline, guest rap by Ricardo da Force, diva wailings by Kelly Llorenna, and Stewart himself, this updated remake could very well become the surprise radio hit of the summer. Of course, it could also become this month's novelty record." British magazine Music Week rated N-Trance's version four out of five in their review.

Charts

Weekly charts

Year-end charts

Certifications

2017 DNCE remix version

On August 25, 2017, Rod Stewart released a remix version featuring a guest appearance from American band DNCE. He sings along with the lead singer of the band, Joe Jonas.

Live performances

They performed the song at 2017 MTV Video Music Awards.

Track listing

Charts

Weekly charts

Year-end charts

Release history

2021 Carmine Appice/Fernando Perdomo Project version

In 2021, Appice and Fernando Perdomo released an instrumental rock album, Energy Overload, that includes what Eric Harabadian of Music Connection Magazine describes as a "harmonic and rhythmic renovation" of Do Ya Think I'm Sexy.

Parodies
In 1979, Steve Dahl along with his band Teenage Radiation released a parody titled "Do You Think I'm Disco?"

References

1978 singles
1978 songs
1979 singles
2017 singles
All Around the World Productions singles
Billboard Hot 100 number-one singles
British disco songs
Cashbox number-one singles
DNCE songs
Gene Summers songs
Music videos directed by Bruce Gowers
N-Trance songs
Number-one singles in Israel
Reprise Records singles
Republic Records singles
Rod Stewart songs
Sabrina Salerno songs
Paris Hilton songs
Sire Records singles
Song recordings produced by Tom Dowd
Songs involved in plagiarism controversies
Songs involved in royalties controversies
Songs written by Carmine Appice
Songs written by Duane Hitchings
Songs written by Rami Yacoub
Songs written by Rod Stewart
UK Singles Chart number-one singles
Warner Records singles